The BBC Cymru Wales Sports Personality of the Year is a televised sporting competition, broadcast on BBC Two every year; and the most prestigious annual sport award in Wales. It was first awarded in 1954, and is currently organised by BBC Cymru Wales. Since a trial in 2002, the competition has been open to public voting, rather than a decision being made within the competition prior to this. More recently it has reverted to being chosen by an expert panel of judges.

Winners 

No award was made in 2020 due to the effects on sport of the Covid-19 pandemic.

See also 
Sport in Wales
BBC Sports Personality of the Year

References

General

Specific

External links
List of all winners from 1954–2006

Wales
BBC Cymru Wales
Awards established in 1954
1954 establishments in Wales